Hinson's Island is a small island within the Great Sound of Bermuda. It lies in the southeast of the sound, and is part of Paget parish, although it was formerly part of Warwick Parish and is still within the Warwick North constituency.

Hinson's Island is the only island in Bermuda served by the government ferry system.  The population of Hinson's Island is approximately 50 people.

Hinson's (formerly known as Brown's or Godet's) Island is one of the larger islands in the Great Sound. Like its neighbours, it was used as a prisoner of war camp during the Second Boer War, then became the base for Bermuda's first seaplane service.

See also
List of lighthouses in Bermuda

References

Islands of Bermuda
Paget Parish
Lighthouses in Bermuda